Slag is a 1970 play by British writer David Hare.  Original cast: Lynn Redgrave, Anna Massey, and Barbara Ferris. Originally staged by the Royal Court. London

Slag is a biting satire in which the only characters are the three teachers of a tiny isolated girls' school.  The play begins with a mutual vow reminiscent of the vow beginning the play Lysistrata in which Greek women vow to deny men sex to protest the Peloponnesian War.  The three women teachers mutually pledge to abstain from sexual intercourse, in protest against the dominance and abusive treatment of women by men, epitomized in the slur against women as "slags".   Conflicts among the teachers' different visions of radical feminism, different motivations, and different interpretations of and commitment to the vow become the grist for duplicitous dominant and abusive acts among them and distracts them from their teaching.  Dominance and Feminism are ridiculed alike, while the number of pupils dwindles to zero in the resulting dysfunctional environment, leaving the three teachers to go their separate ways.

Slag was a breakthrough play for David Hare.  Reputedly written by Hare in three days, working out of the back of a van, it won for him the Evening Standard (London) Award for most promising new playwright and launched his prolific and successful career as a playwright.

1970 plays
Plays by David Hare